Rejuvenate! is the third album led by saxophonist Ralph Moore which was recorded in 1988 and released on the Dutch Criss Cross Jazz label.

Reception 

In his review on AllMusic, Scott Yanow stated "The two horns blend together very well and consistently inspire each other; the rhythm section is state-of-the-art for this type of modern hard bop music, and the overall results are swinging and at times a bit adventurous. Recommended."

Track listing 
All compositions by Ralph Moore except where noted
 "Rejuvenate!" (Bobby Porcelli) – 6:38
 "Josephine" – 8:49
 "C.R.M." – 8:14
 "Exact Change" (Mulgrew Miller) – 8:44
 "It Might as Well Be Spring" (Richard Rodgers, Oscar Hammerstein II) – 7:02	
 "Song for Soweto" – 9:02
 "Melody for Mr. C" (Steve Turre) – 10:55 Additional track on CD release

Personnel 
Ralph Moore – tenor saxophone, soprano saxophone
Steve Turre – trombone, conch shell
Mulgrew Miller – piano
Peter Washington – bass 
Marvin "Smitty" Smith – drums

References 

Ralph Moore albums
1989 albums
Criss Cross Jazz albums
Albums recorded at Van Gelder Studio